The 120 ft Motor Lighter was a class of lighters designed by the Australian Shipbuilding Board during World War II and built for the Royal Australian Navy, Australian Army, Royal Australian Air Force, Royal Navy and the US Army.

Design

Operators

Royal Australian Navy
The Royal Australian Navy ordered three refrigerator, two stores and nine water variants.

Australian Army
Thirty one vessels were ordered by the Australian Army.

Royal Australian Air Force
The Royal Australian Air Force ordered five vessels.

Royal Navy

United States Army

Notes

References

Cargo ships of the Royal Australian Navy
Auxiliary ships of the Royal Navy
Ships of the Royal Australian Air Force
Ships of the United States Army
Cargo ships of the Australian Army